Amâncio José Pinto Fortes (born 18 April 1990) is an Angolan footballer who plays as a attacking midfielder. He also holds Portuguese citizenship.

References

External links

1990 births
Footballers from Luanda
Living people
Angolan footballers
Association football forwards
C.R.D. Libolo players
Girabola players
G.D. Interclube players
Progresso Associação do Sambizanga players
PSIS Semarang players
Atlético Onubense players
C.D. Fátima players
PFC CSKA Sofia players
FC Zimbru Chișinău players
Moldovan Super Liga players
Casa Pia A.C. players
FC Dacia Chișinău players
FK Ventspils players
FK Liepāja players
Latvian Higher League players
Radomiak Radom players
Jeunesse Esch players
I liga players
Luxembourg National Division players
Angolan expatriate footballers
Expatriate footballers in Indonesia
Expatriate footballers in Spain
Expatriate footballers in Bulgaria
Expatriate footballers in Moldova
Expatriate footballers in Latvia
Expatriate footballers in Poland
Expatriate footballers in Luxembourg
Angolan expatriate sportspeople in Spain
Angolan expatriate sportspeople in Moldova
Angolan expatriate sportspeople in Poland